The following is an overview of public housing estates in Hung Hom, To Kwa Wan and Ma Tau Wai, of Kowloon City District, Hong Kong, including Home Ownership Scheme (HOS), Private Sector Participation Scheme (PSPS), and Tenant Purchase Scheme (TPS) estates.

History

Overview

Hung Hom Estate 

Hung Hom Estate is built on a hill along Dyer Avenue and next to Whampoa Estate and Whampoa Garden. It now consists of five residential buildings completed in two stages in 1999 and 2011 respectively.

The estate, informally called Tai Wan Shan Resettlement Estate or Tai Wan Shan Estate, was a resettlement estate built in Tai Wan Shan, a hill in Hung Hom area. It had four 7-storey blocks completed in 1956. All four blocks were demolished for redevelopment in 1996 and 2000. Completed 1999, redevelopment phase 1 project consists of two residential buildings built in the former site of Block 3 and 4. Redevelopment phase 2, finished 2011, consists of three more 40-storey buildings on the former site of Block 1 and Block 3.

Houses

Ma Tau Wai Estate 

Ma Tau Wai Estate is the oldest existing public housing estate in Kowloon City District. It consists of 5 residential blocks completed in 1962 and 1965. Although it was developed by Hong Kong Housing Authority, it is currently managed by Hong Kong Housing Society.

The location of the estate was partly the location of the Ma Tau Chung Camp during World War II. In 2007, the Housing Authority found that all buildings in the estate were structurally sound. Thus, structural repair and improvement works will be carried out to sustain the buildings for the next 15 years.

Houses

Chun Seen Mei Chuen 

Chun Seen Mei Chuen has three residential blocks built in 1965, providing a total of 1027 units.

Houses 

Chun Seen Mei Chuen is in Primary One Admission (POA) School Net 34. Within the school net are multiple aided schools (operated independently but funded with government money) and two government schools: Farm Road Government Primary School and Ma Tau Chung Government Primary School.

Ka Wai Chuen 

Ka Wai Chuen is a mixed public and a Flat-for-Sale Scheme estate developed by Hong Kong Housing Society in the vicinity of Fat Kwong Street, Ma Tau Wai Road and Station Lane. It has 9 residential blocks completed in 1984, 1987, 1990 and 1993. Five of the blocks are for rental while 4 of them are for sale.

Ka Wai Chuen was built on the former site of the old Hung Hom Estate and consisted of nine 6-storey blocks built between 1955 and 1958. The estate was redeveloped into 4 phases, and nine buildings were constructed in 1984, 1987, 1990 and 1993. In 1990, the estate was renamed to the current Ka Wai Chuen, which was named from the pen name of Mr. Andrew Cheung Yau Kuen, one of the founders of Hong Kong Housing Society.

Houses 

Ka Wai Chuen is in Primary One Admission (POA) School Net 35. Within the school net are multiple aided schools (operated independently but funded with government money) and Ma Tau Chung Government Primary School (Hung Hom Bay).

Lok Man Sun Chuen 

Lok Man Sun Chuen is located in Kau Pui Lung Road, To Kwa Wan, developed by Hong Kong Housing Society. It has nine residential blocks completed in 1970, 1971, 1973 and 1974 respectively, providing a total of 3676 units.

Houses 

Lok Man Sun Chuen is in Primary One Admission (POA) School Net 34. Within the school net are multiple aided schools (operated independently but funded with government money) and two government schools: Farm Road Government Primary School and Ma Tau Chung Government Primary School.

See also
 Public housing in Hong Kong
 List of public housing estates in Hong Kong

References 

Hung Hom
Ma Tau Wai
To Kwa Wan
 
 
Proposed infrastructure in Hong Kong